The year 1954 in film involved some significant events and memorable ones.

Top-grossing films

United States

The top ten 1954 released films by box office gross in the United States are as follows:

International

Events
 A reproduction of "America's First Movie Studio", Thomas Edison's Black Maria, is constructed.
 May 12 — The Marx Brothers' Zeppo Marx divorces wife Marion Benda. The two were married in 1927.
 September 29 — A Star is Born premieres and marks Judy Garland's comeback after her termination from her contract at MGM. An astounding success with critics and audiences, A Star is Born not only marked the first time that legendary director George Cukor had made a film musical and film that is in Technicolor and in the anamorphic widescreen format, but also it has been regarded as one of the Garland's best performances in her film career. 
 November 3 — The film Godzilla premieres in Japan. It became a huge success and became the first in series of Godzilla film, the longest running film series in history.

Awards

Top ten money-making stars
Exhibitors selected the following as the Top Ten Money Making Stars of the Year in Quigley Publishing Company's annual poll. John Wayne became the first actor to regain the number one spot after losing that position.

Top Western stars

The poll also revealed the top Western stars.

Notable films released in 1954
United States unless stated

#
3 Ring Circus, starring Dean Martin and Jerry Lewis
20,000 Leagues Under the Sea, starring Kirk Douglas and James Mason

A
Aar Paar (This or That), directed by and starring Guru Dutt – (India)
About Mrs. Leslie, starring Shirley Booth
Robinson Crusoe (Aventuras de Robinson Crusoe), directed by Luis Buñuel – (Mexico)
Alaska Seas, starring Robert Ryan and Jan Sterling
Amar (Immortal), starring Madhubala, Nimmi and Dilip Kumar – (India)
An American in Rome (Un americano a Roma), starring Alberto Sordi – (Italy)
Andha Naal (That Day) – (India)
Animal Farm, an animated film – (GB)
Apache, starring Burt Lancaster
Attila, starring Anthony Quinn and Sophia Loren – (France/Italy)

B
Bahut Din Huwe, starring Madhubala – (India)
The Back of Beyond – (Australia)
The Barefoot Contessa, directed by Joseph L. Mankiewicz, starring Humphrey Bogart, Ava Gardner, Edmond O'Brien, Rossano Brazzi
Beachhead, starring Tony Curtis and Mary Murphy
Beau Brummell, starring Stewart Granger, Elizabeth Taylor, Peter Ustinov
Beautiful Stranger, aka Twist of Fate, starring Ginger Rogers – (GB/U.S.)
The Belles of St. Trinian's, starring Alastair Sim, Joyce Grenfell and George Cole – (GB)
Betrayed, fourth and final film co-starring Clark Gable and Lana Turner
A Big Family (Bolshaya semya) – (USSR)
The Black Knight, starring Alan Ladd – (GB/U.S.)
The Black Shield of Falworth, starring Tony Curtis and Janet Leigh
Black Tuesday, starring Edward G. Robinson and Peter Graves
Black Widow, starring Ginger Rogers, Gene Tierney, Peggy Ann Garner, Van Heflin, George Raft
Boot Polish – (India)
Boris Godunov – (USSR)
The Bowery Boys Meet the Monsters, starring Leo Gorcey, Huntz Hall and Ellen Corby
Bread, Love and Jealousy (Pane, Amore e Gelosia), starring Vittorio De Sica and Gina Lollobrigida – (Italy)
The Bridges at Toko-Ri, directed by Mark Robson, starring William Holden, Grace Kelly, Fredric March, Mickey Rooney
Brigadoon, directed by Vincente Minnelli, starring Gene Kelly, Cyd Charisse, Van Johnson
Broken Lance, starring Spencer Tracy, Robert Wagner, Jean Peters, Richard Widmark, Katy Jurado

C
 Cadet Rousselle, directed by André Hunebelle, starring François Périer and Dany Robin – (France)
The Caine Mutiny, directed by Edward Dmytryk, starring Humphrey Bogart, Van Johnson, Fred MacMurray, José Ferrer, Robert Francis, May Wynn, E. G. Marshall
Canaris, directed by Alfred Weidenmann – (West Germany)
Carmen Jones, starring Dorothy Dandridge (first African-American to be Oscar-nominated for Best Actress)
Casanova's Big Night, starring Bob Hope
Chronicle of Poor Lovers (Cronache di poveri amanti) – (Italy)
Circus Fandango – (Norway)
The Country Girl, directed by George Seaton, starring Bing Crosby, Grace Kelly, William Holden
Creature from the Black Lagoon, directed by Jack Arnold
Crime Wave, directed by André de Toth, starring Sterling Hayden and Phyllis Kirk
Crossed Swords ([Il Maestro di Don Giovanni]), starring Errol Flynn and Gina Lollobrigida – (United States/Italy)
The Crucified Lovers (Chikamatsu Monogatari), directed by Kenji Mizoguchi, starring Kazuo Hasegawa – (Japan)

D
Dangerous Mission, starring Victor Mature and Piper Laurie
Deep in My Heart, directed by Stanley Donen, starring José Ferrer and Merle Oberon
Demetrius and the Gladiators, starring Victor Mature and Susan Hayward
Désirée, starring Marlon Brando and Jean Simmons
Dial M for Murder, directed by Alfred Hitchcock, starring Ray Milland, Robert Cummings, Grace Kelly
Doctor in the House, starring Dirk Bogarde, first of "Doctor" series – (GB)
Down Three Dark Streets, starring Broderick Crawford and Ruth Roman
Drive a Crooked Road, starring Mickey Rooney and Dianne Foster
Drum Beat, directed by Delmer Daves, starring Alan Ladd

E
The Egyptian, starring Jean Simmons, Gene Tierney, Victor Mature, Bella Darvi, Edmund Purdom
Eight O'Clock Walk, starring Richard Attenborough and Cathy O'Donnell – (GB)
Elephant Walk, starring Elizabeth Taylor and Peter Finch
Executive Suite, starring William Holden, Barbara Stanwyck, June Allyson, Fredric March, Louis Calhern, Walter Pidgeon, Nina Foch

F
The Far Country, directed by Anthony Mann, starring James Stewart, Ruth Roman, Walter Brennan
Father Brown, starring Alec Guinness – (GB)
Fear (La Paura), directed by Roberto Rossellini, starring Ingrid Bergman – (West Germany/Italy)
Five Boys from Barska Street (Piątka z ulicy Barskiej) – (Poland)
Flame and the Flesh, starring Lana Turner
French Cancan, starring Jean Gabin – (France/Italy)
The French Line, starring Jane Russell

G
Garden of Evil, starring Gary Cooper, Susan Hayward, Richard Widmark
The Glenn Miller Story, directed by Anthony Mann, starring Jimmy Stewart and June Allyson
Godzilla (Gojira), directed by Ishirō Honda – (Japan)
The Gold of Naples (L'oro di Napoli), directed by Vittorio De Sica, starring Silvana Mangano and Sophia Loren – (Italy)
The Good Die Young, directed by Lewis Gilbert, starring Stanley Baker and Laurence Harvey – (GB)

H
Hansel and Gretel: An Opera Fantasy, a Stop motion animated film
Happy Ever After, starring David Niven and Yvonne De Carlo – (GB)
Hell and High Water, directed by Samuel Fuller, starring Richard Widmark
Hell Below Zero, starring Alan Ladd
Hell's Half Acre, starring Evelyn Keyes and Wendell Corey
The High and the Mighty, starring John Wayne, Robert Stack, Laraine Day, Claire Trevor, Phil Harris
Highway Dragnet, starring Richard Conte and Joan Bennett
Hobson's Choice, directed by David Lean, starring Charles Laughton and John Mills – (GB)
The House Across the Lake, aka Heat Wave, starring Alex Nicol and Hillary Brooke – (GB)
Human Desire, starring Glenn Ford, Gloria Grahame, Broderick Crawford

I
Illusion Travels by Streetcar (La ilusión viaja en tranvía), directed by Luis Buñuel, starring Lilia Prado – (Mexico)
Inauguration of the Pleasure Dome, directed by Kenneth Anger
An Inspector Calls, with Alastair Sim, based on the J. B. Priestley play – (GB)
It Should Happen to You, starring Judy Holliday, Peter Lawford, Jack Lemmon

J
Jagriti (The Awakening) – (India)
Johnny Guitar, directed by Nicholas Ray, starring Joan Crawford, Sterling Hayden, Mercedes McCambridge
Journey to Italy (Viaggio in Italia), directed by Roberto Rossellini, starring Ingrid Bergman and George Sanders – (France/Italy)

K
King Richard and the Crusaders, starring Rex Harrison and Virginia Mayo
Knock on Wood, starring Danny Kaye

L
The Lady of the Camellias (La Mujer de las camelias) – (Argentina)
The Last Bridge (Die Letzte Brücke), starring Maria Schell and Bernhard Wicki – (Austria)
Late Chrysanthemums (bangiku), directed by Mikio Naruse – (Japan)
A Lesson in Love (En lektion i kärlek), directed by Ingmar Bergman, starring Eva Dahlbeck and Gunnar Björnstrand – (Sweden)
A Life at Stake, starring Angela Lansbury
Liliomfi – (Hungary)
Living It Up, starring Dean Martin and Jerry Lewis
The Long, Long Trailer, starring Lucille Ball and Desi Arnaz
The Long Wait, starring Anthony Quinn
Loophole, starring Barry Sullivan and Dorothy Malone

M
Mad About Men, starring Glynis Johns and Margaret Rutherford – (U.K.)
Madame X (I Agnostos)Madame X (1954 film) – (Greece)
Maddalena – (Italy)
The Maggie, directed by Alexander Mackendrick – (GB)
Magnificent Obsession, directed by Douglas Sirk, starring Jane Wyman and Rock Hudson
The Million Pound Note, starring Gregory Peck – (GB)

N
Nagin, starring Vyjayanthimala and Pradeep Kumar – (India)
Naked Alibi, starring Sterling Hayden and Gloria Grahame
The Naked Jungle, starring Eleanor Parker and Charlton Heston
Neelakuyil (The Blue Cuckoo) – (India)
Night People, directed by Nunnally Johnson, starring Gregory Peck, Broderick Crawford, Buddy Ebsen
Nothing But Trouble (Aldri annet enn bråk) – (Norway)

O
On the Waterfront, directed by Elia Kazan, starring Marlon Brando with Eva Marie Saint, Karl Malden, Lee J. Cobb, Rod Steiger—winner of eight Oscars
On Trial (L'affaire Maurizius; Il caso Mauritius), directed by Julien Duvivier – (France/Italy)
The Outcast, starring John Derek

P
Phantom of the Rue Morgue, starring Karl Malden, Patricia Medina, Merv Griffin
Phffft, starring Judy Holliday, Jack Lemmon, Kim Novak
Pride of the Blue Grass, starring Lloyd Bridges and Vera Miles
Prince Valiant, starring Robert Wagner, James Mason, Janet Leigh
Prisoner of War, starring Ronald Reagan
Private Hell 36, directed by Don Siegel, starring Ida Lupino
Pushover, starring Fred MacMurray and Kim Novak (in her film debut)

R
Radio Cab Murder, directed by Vernon Sewell, starring Jimmy Hanley and Lana Morris – (GB)
The Raid, starring Van Heflin, Anne Bancroft, Lee Marvin
Rear Window, directed by Alfred Hitchcock, starring James Stewart, Grace Kelly, Thelma Ritter, Wendell Corey, Raymond Burr
Red Garters, directed by George Marshall, starring Rosemary Clooney
Return to Treasure Island, starring Tab Hunter
Riot in Cell Block 11, directed by Don Siegel, starring Neville Brand
River of No Return, directed by Otto Preminger, starring Robert Mitchum and Marilyn Monroe
Robinson Crusoe, starring Dan O'Herlihy
Rogue Cop, starring Robert Taylor and Janet Leigh
Romeo and Juliet, starring Laurence Harvey – (Italy/GB)

S
Sabrina, directed by Billy Wilder, starring Humphrey Bogart, Audrey Hepburn, William Holden
Salt of the Earth, starring Rosaura Revueltas and Will Geer
Samurai I: Musashi Miyamoto (Miyamoto Musashi), directed by Hiroshi Inagaki, starring Toshiro Mifune – (Japan)
Sansho the Bailiff (Sanshō Dayũ), directed by Kenji Mizoguchi, starring Kinuyo Tanaka – (Japan)
Saskatchewan, starring Alan Ladd
The Sea Shall Not Have Them, directed by Lewis Gilbert, starring Michael Redgrave, Dirk Bogarde, Anthony Steel, Nigel Patrick – (GB)
Secret of the Incas, starring Charlton Heston
The Seekers, starring Jack Hawkins and Glynis Johns – (GB)
Senso, directed by Luchino Visconti, starring Alida Valli and Farley Granger – (Italy)
Seven Brides for Seven Brothers, directed by Stanley Donen, starring Jane Powell and Howard Keel
Seven Samurai (Shichinin no Samurai), directed by Akira Kurosawa, starring Toshiro Mifune and Takashi Shimura – (Japan)
She Couldn't Say No, starring Robert Mitchum and Jean Simmons
Shield for Murder, starring Edmond O'Brien
The Silver Chalice, starring Paul Newman (in his film debut)
Silver Lode, starring Dan Duryea
Sira` Fi al-Wadi (Struggle in the Valley), directed by Youssef Chahine – (Egypt)
Sitting Bull, starring Dale Robertson and J. Carrol Naish
Sound of the Mountain (Yama no Oto), directed by Mikio Naruse – (Japan)
A Star Is Born, directed by George Cukor, starring Judy Garland and James Mason, musical remake of 1937 film
Star of India, starring Cornel Wilde and Herbert Lom – (GB)
La strada (The Road), directed by Federico Fellini, starring Anthony Quinn – (Italy)
Stranger from Venus, directed by Burt Balaban, starring Patricia Neal and Derek Bond
Suddenly, starring Frank Sinatra and Sterling Hayden
Supir Istimewa, directed by Rempo Urip and starring MS Priyadi and Ermina Zaenah (Indonesia)
Susan Slept Here, starring Debbie Reynolds and Dick Powell

T
Tanganyika, starring Van Heflin and Ruth Roman
Taza, Son of Cochise, starring Rock Hudson
Them!, starring James Whitmore, Edmund Gwenn, Joan Weldon, James Arness
There's No Business Like Show Business, starring Ethel Merman, Dan Dailey, Donald O'Connor, Mitzi Gaynor, Marilyn Monroe
They Who Dare, starring Dirk Bogarde – (GB)
Three Coins in the Fountain, starring Jean Peters, Dorothy McGuire, Maggie McNamara
Three Young Texans, starring Jeffrey Hunter, Mitzi Gaynor, Keefe Brasselle
Too Bad She's Bad (Peccato che sia una canaglia), starring Marcello Mastroianni, Sophia Loren, Vittorio De Sica – (Italy)
Top Banana, starring Phil Silvers
Touchez pas au grisbi (Hands Off the Loot), starring Jean Gabin – (France/Italy)
Track of the Cat, directed by William A. Wellman, starring Robert Mitchum and Teresa Wright
Twenty-Four Eyes (Nijū-shi no Hitomi) – (Japan)
Twist of Fate, starring Ginger Rogers

V
Vera Cruz, starring Gary Cooper and Burt Lancaster

W
The Weak and the Wicked, directed by J. Lee Thompson, starring Glynis Johns and Diana Dors – (GB)
West of Zanzibar (1954 film), directed by Harry Watt, starring Anthony Steel, Sheila Sim, Edric Connor & Orlando Martins – (U.K.)
White Christmas, directed by Michael Curtiz, starring Bing Crosby, Danny Kaye, Rosemary Clooney, Vera-Ellen, Dean Jagger
Windfall in Athens (Kyriakatiko xypnima), directed by Michael Cacoyannis – (Greece)
Witness to Murder, directed by Roy Rowland, starring Barbara Stanwyck, Gary Merrill, George Sanders
Woman's World, starring June Allyson, Clifton Webb, Fred MacMurray, Van Heflin, Lauren Bacall, Arlene Dahl
Wyoming Renegades, starring Phil Carey

Y
Young at Heart, starring Frank Sinatra and Doris Day
The Young Lovers, directed by Anthony Asquith – (GB)

Serials
Gunfighters of the Northwest, starring Clayton Moore and Phyllis Coates
Man with the Steel Whip, starring Dick Simmons
Riding with Buffalo Bill
Trader Tom of the China Seas, starring Harry Lauter and Aline Towne

Short film series
Looney Tunes (1930–1969)
Terrytoons (1930–1964)
Merrie Melodies (1931–1969)
Popeye (1933–1957)
The Three Stooges (1934–1959)
Bugs Bunny (1940–1962)
Tom and Jerry (1940–1958)
Mighty Mouse (1942–1955)
Chip 'n' Dale (1943–1956)
Droopy (1943–1958)
Barney Bear (1939–1954)
Yosemite Sam (1945–1963)
Speedy Gonzales (1953–1968)
Ranger Don (1953–1956)

Births
January 1
Richard Edson, American actor and musician
Rawiri Paratene, New Zealand actor, director and writer
Helen Wellington-Lloyd, South African-born British artist and actress
January 6 – Anthony Minghella, English film director and screenwriter (d. 2008)
January 9 - John Sparkes, Welsh actor and comedian
January 19 - Katey Sagal, American actress and singer-songwriter
January 25 - Sean Lawlor, Irish character actor and playwright (d. 2009)
January 29 – Oprah Winfrey, American actress and television personality
February 2 – Christie Brinkley, American model and actress
February 6 – Aare Laanemets, Estonian actor (d. 2000)
February 8 - Alistair Browning, New Zealand actor (d. 2019)
February 9 - Leslie Bevis, retired American model and actress
February 17 – Rene Russo, American actress
February 18 – John Travolta, American actor
February 20 - Anthony Head, English actor and singer
February 21 - Christopher Mayer (American actor), American actor (d. 2011)
March 1 – Ron Howard, American director and actor
March 4 – Catherine O'Hara, Canadian actress
March 9 - Martin P. Robinson, American puppeteer
March 15 – Craig Wasson, American actor
March 17 – Lesley-Anne Down, English actress
March 22 - Tommy Hollis, American actor (d. 2001)
March 24 – Robert Carradine, American actor
April 7 – Jackie Chan, Hong Kong-born actor
April 9 – Dennis Quaid, American actor
April 10 – Peter MacNicol, American actor
April 16 – Ellen Barkin, American actress
April 27 – John Cygan, American actor, voice artist and comedian (d. 2017)
April 29 – Jerry Seinfeld, American stand-up comedian and actor
May 7 – Amy Heckerling, American director
May 8
Stephen Furst, American actor, director and producer (d. 2017)
David Keith, American actor and director
May 10 - Mike Hagerty, American actor (d. 2022)
May 18 - Patrick St. Esprit, American character actor
May 21 - Jean Kasem, American former actress
June 2
Dennis Haysbert, American actor
Jeannine Taylor, American actress
June 5 - Haluk Bilginer, Turkish actor
June 6
Harvey Fierstein, American actor and screenwriter
Merle Talvik, Estonian actress 
June 14
Will Patton, American actor
Jan Rabson, American actor and voice actor (d. 2022)
June 15 – Jim Belushi, American actor
June 19 – Kathleen Turner, American actress
June 21 - Robert Pastorelli, American actor (d. 2004)
June 22 – Chris Lemmon, American actor and author
June 26 - David Steen (actor), American playwright, actor and writer
June 28 – Alice Krige, South African actress
August 12 – Sam J. Jones, American actor
August 13 – Tõnu Kilgas, Estonian actor and singer
August 15 - Sean Bury, British actor
August 16 – James Cameron, Canadian-born director
August 20
Al Roker, American weather forecaster, journalist, television personality, actor and author
Theresa Saldana, American actress and writer (d. 2016)
August 22 - Jay Patterson, American actor
September 13 - Isiah Whitlock Jr., American actor
September 15 - Brad Leland, American actor
September 19
David Bamber, English actor
Blanche Ravalec, French actress and dubbing artist
September 29 - Mark Mitchell (actor), Australian actor and comedian
October 2 – Lorraine Bracco, American actress
October 9
Scott Bakula, American actor
John O'Hurley, American actor, comedian, singer, author, game show host and television personality
October 10
David Barron (film producer), British producer
Rekha, Indian actress
Patric Zimmerman, retired American voice actor
October 11 - Tim Choate, American actor (d. 2004)
October 14 - Elizabeth Sung, Chinese-American actress, director and screenwriter (d. 2018)
October 15 - Jere Burns, American actor
October 18
Arliss Howard, American actor, screenwriter and director
Bob Weinstein, American producer
October 19 - Ken Stott, Scottish actor
October 23 – Ang Lee, Taiwanese director
October 26
D. W. Moffett, American actor
James Pickens Jr., American actor
November 7 – Kamal Haasan, Indian actor, director, script-writer, producer and singer
November 19 – Kathleen Quinlan, American actress
November 20 - Richard Brooker, British actor and stuntman (d. 2013)
November 21 - Timothy Stack, American actor, producer and screenwriter
November 29 – Joel Coen, American director, producer and screenwriter
November 30 - Simonetta Stefanelli, Italian fashion designer and retired actress
December 4 – Tony Todd, American actor and producer
December 18 – Ray Liotta, American actor (d. 2022)
December 28 – Denzel Washington, American actor

Deaths
January 5 – Lillian Rich, 54, English actress, The Golden Bed, On the Front Page
January 11 – Oscar Straus, 83, Viennese composer, La Ronde
January 16 – Baburao Painter, 63, Indian film director, Savkari Pash
January 18 – Sydney Greenstreet, 74, English actor, Casablanca, The Maltese Falcon, Christmas in Connecticut, The Mask of Dimitrios
January 30 – John Murray Anderson, 67, Canadian director, King of Jazz
January 31 – Florence Bates, 65, American actress, Rebecca
February 1 – Yvonne de Bray, 64, French actress, Les Parents terribles
February 9 – Mabel Paige, 73, American actress, Lucky Jordan, Murder, He Says
February 12 – Dziga Vertov, 58, Russian filmmaker, Man with a Movie Camera
February 13 – Stephen Auer, 53, American producer, Trail of Kit Carson
February 21 – William K. Howard, 54, American director, The Power and the Glory, Johnny Come Lately
 March 5 – John Eberson, 78, American movie palace architect
March 7 – Will H. Hays, 74, American movie censor, first chairman of the Motion Picture Producers and Distributors of America
March 8 – John L. Balderston, 64, American screenwriter, The Prisoner of Zenda, Gaslight
March 14 – Otto Gebühr, 76, German actor, The Great King
March 18 – Louis Lipstone, 61, American conductor, head of Paramount Pictures music department
March 24 – Alberto Colombo, 65, American film composer and music director, Portia on Trial
March 30 – Pauline Brunius, 73, Swedish actress, director and screenwriter, Charles XII
April 1 – Jack Lait, 71, American author, New York Confidential
April 3 – Ernest Vajda, 67, Hungarian actor and screenwriter, Smilin' Through
April 4 – Frederick Lonsdale, 73, English playwright and screenwriter, The Private Life of Don Juan
April 10 – Auguste Lumiere, 91, French film pioneer 
April 29 – Joe May, 73, Austrian director, The House of Fear, The Invisible Man Returns
May 1 – Arthur Johnston, 56, Composer, Pennies from Heaven
May 3 – Tom Tyler, 50, American actor, Adventures of Captain Marvel, The Phantom
May 15 – Herbert I. Leeds, 54, American director, Mr. Moto in Danger Island
May 17 – Ethel Hill, 56, American screenwriter, The Little Princess, In Old Oklahoma
May 18 – Fred Waller, 67, American film pioneer, inventor of Cinerama
May 20 – Hans von Wolzogen, 65, German film producer and director, Sprengbagger 1010
May 25 – Hans Janowitz, 63, German writer, The Cabinet of Dr. Caligari
May 31 – Guglielmo Barnabò, 66, Italian actor, Miracle in Milan
June 27 – Theodor Loos, 71, German actor, Die Nibelungen
June 28 – Ludwig Schmitz, 70, German actor, The Heath is Green
July 1 – Thea von Harbou, 65, German screenwriter, novelist, director and actress, Metropolis
July 6 – Gabriel Pascal, 60, Hungarian film producer and director, Pygmalion
July 8 – Gerald Geraghty, 47, American screenwriter, The Jungle Princess
July 12 – Lord Grantley, 62, British film executive
July 13 – Irving Pichel, 63, American director and actor, The Most Dangerous Game, Santa Fe, Oliver Twist, How Green Was My Valley
July 14 – Al Hill, 62, American actor, The Payoff, The Border Patrolman
July 23 – Leonard Goldstein, 51, American producer, Ma and Pa Kettle
July 24 – Effie Shannon, 87, American actress, Sally of the Sawdust
August 4 – Harald Paulsen, 58, German actor and director, Ave Maria
August 11 – Murray Kinnell, 65, English-born American actor, The Public Enemy
August 19 – Terry Ramsaye, 68, American producer and movie historian, author of A Million and One Nights: A History of the Motion Picture
August 24 – Lewis D. Collins, 55, American director, The Desert Trail
September 3 – Eugene Pallette, 65, American actor, My Man Godfrey, The Adventures of Robin Hood
September 28 –  Bert Lytell, 69, American actor, The Lone Wolf
October 22 – Charles Skouras, 65, American movie executive and president of Fox West Coast
October 22 – George McManus, 70, American cartoonist, Bringing Up Father
November 11 – Reinhold Schünzel, 68, German director and actor, The Ice Follies of 1939, Notorious
November 15 – Lionel Barrymore, 76, American actor, It's a Wonderful Life, You Can't Take It with You, Key Largo,  Treasure Island, Grand Hotel
November 22 – Moroni Olsen, 65, American actor, The Three Musketeers
November 22 – Roy Rene, 63, Australian comedian, Strike Me Lucky
November 29 – Eero Kilpi, 77, Finnish actor, Anna Liisa
December 6 – Truly Shattuck, 79, American actress, A Wise Fool
December 8 – Gladys George, 50, American actress, The Maltese Falcon, The Best Years of Our Lives, The Roaring Twenties, Detective Story
December 18 – Maria Eis, 58, Austrian actress, The Eternal Waltz

Film debuts 
Ursula Andress – An American in Rome
R.G. Armstrong – Garden of Eden
Martin Balsam – On the Waterfront
Sean Connery – Lilacs in the Spring
Angie Dickinson – Lucky Me
Charles Grodin – 20,000 Leagues Under the Sea
David Hemmings – The Rainbow Jacket
Pat Hingle – On the Waterfront
James Hong – Dragonfly Squadron
Jack Lemmon – It Should Happen to You
Roger Moore – The Last Time I Saw Paris
Paul Newman – The Silver Chalice
Kim Novak – The French Line
Donald Pleasence – The Beachcomber
Eva Marie Saint – On the Waterfront
John Saxon – It Should Happen to You
Omar Sharif – Devil of the Sahara
Rod Taylor – King of the Coral Sea
Godzilla – Godzilla

Notes

References

 
Film by year